Prunus transarisanensis is a species of plant in the family Rosaceae. It is endemic to Taiwan. The similar species Prunus takasagomontana, also endemic to Taiwan, is thought by some authorities to be conspecific.

References

transarisanensis
Endemic flora of Taiwan
Near threatened flora of Asia
Taxonomy articles created by Polbot